Macintosh Portable is a laptop designed, manufactured, and sold by Apple Computer, Inc. from September 1989 to October 1991. It is the first battery-powered Macintosh, which garnered significant excitement from critics, but sales to customers were quite low. It featured a fast, sharp, and expensive monochrome active matrix LCD screen in a hinged design that covered the keyboard when the machine was not in use. The Portable was one of the early consumer laptops to employ an active matrix panel—only the most expensive of the initial PowerBook line, the PowerBook 170, had such a panel. The machine was designed to deliver high performance, at the cost of increased price and weight. The Portable was discontinued in October 1991.

The Portable has features similar to the Atari STacy, a version of their Atari ST computer which contained a built in keyboard and monitor. Macintosh Portable can run Macintosh System 6.0.4 through System 7.5.5.

Hardware 
The pointer was a built-in trackball that could be removed and located on either side of the keyboard. There were three drive configurations available for Macintosh Portable. A Portable could ship with one floppy drive, with two floppy drives, or with a hard drive and a floppy drive. The floppy drive is 1.44 MB. Most Macintosh Portable units came with a hard drive. It was a custom-engineered Conner CP-3045 (known by Apple as "Hard Disk 40SC"). It holds 40 MB of data, consumes less power compared to most hard drives of its time, and it has a proprietary SCSI connector; adapters that allow standard SCSI drives to be used on the Portable exist, but they are expensive. At 16 pounds (7.2 kilograms) and 4 inches (10 centimetres) thick, the Portable was a heavy and bulky portable computer. The main contributor to the Portable's weight and bulk was its lead-acid battery.

Display issues 
Despite the dramatic improvement in terms of ergonomics offered by the responsiveness, sharpness, and uniformity of its active matrix panel, one of the primary drawbacks of the Portable was poor readability in low-light situations. Consequently, in February 1991, Apple introduced a backlit Macintosh Portable (model M5126). The backlight feature was a welcomed improvement, but it reduced the battery life by about a half. An upgrade kit was also offered for the earlier model as well, which plugged into the ROM expansion slot. The Portable used expensive SRAM memory in an effort to maximize battery life and to provide an "instant on" low-power sleep mode. In the newer backlit Portable, Apple changed SRAM memory to the less expensive (but more power-hungry) pseudo-SRAM, which reduced the total RAM expansion to 8 MB, and lowered the price.

Battery issues 
The lead-acid battery on the non-backlit Portable offered up to ten hours of usage time, and the Portable draws the same amount of power when turned off, and when in sleep mode. Unlike later portable computers from Apple and other manufacturers, the battery is wired in-series with the AC power supply. There being no possible alternative direct connection to the AC supply, a dead battery meant that the computer could not be operated. The original power supply had very low output. Several popular unauthorized workarounds were devised, including using a power supply from the PowerBook 100 series, which provides higher output. As with automotive batteries, the sealed lead-acid cells used in the Portable failed if they were fully discharged. The batteries are no longer manufactured and it is very rare to find an original battery that will hold a charge and allow the computer to start. It is possible to repack the battery with new cells, or use alternative 6 V batteries. There were three lead-acid cells inside the battery: each were manufactured by Gates Energy Products (now EnerSys), and they were also used in Quantum 1 battery packs for photographic flash use.

Development 
There is some indication that Apple executives at the time, particularly, Jean-Louis Gassée, were aware of the design problems concerning the Macintosh Portable. These problems, combined with supply issues of the newly developed active matrix screen, caused numerous delays in launching the computer. While it cannot be determined what the initial internal intended launch date was, an AppleDesign illustration depicts prototypes dated 1986. Initial officially announced launch dates indicated that the Macintosh Portable would be available by June 1988. The Macintosh Portable itself also suggests a lengthy development time with a silkscreen date stamp of 1987 on the production keyboard PCB, indicating a close-to-final design was likely to have been determined by then. The computer, however would not be launched for over two years, with the final launch date being September 20, 1989.

Reception 
The Macintosh Portable product launch was held at the Universal Amphitheater in Universal City, California at an estimated cost of $1 million with over 5,000 guests. The press reaction was mixed, with many praising the clear LCD screen, but most shunning the computer due to its size, weight and high cost, with the Los Angeles Times stating "It’s too big, too heavy and too expensive." Others noted that the computer seemed behind the times compared to competing laptops, stating that "This machine would have been OK 12 months or 18 months ago. But not today."

Apple had forecast first year sales of 50,000 units, however the computer only generated lackluster sales of 10,000 units in its first quarter on the market. Apple then reduced the price of the Macintosh Portable by $1,000 in 1990, just 7 months after launch, and discontinued the computer in 1991 with the launch of its replacement, the PowerBook series.

The Outbound 
The Outbound laptop was a Mac-compatible laptop available during the same time period as the Portable. It was significantly smaller, less expensive, and lighter, but offered a much less responsive "twist" STN LCD and a less ergonomic pointing device. It was also restricted to 4 MB of RAM, due to the requirement that users install a ROM chip from an Apple machine such as Macintosh Plus.

Timeline

References

External links 

 Mac Portable profile on Low End Mac
 More pictures of a Mac Portable
 
 

Portable
Portable
Portable
Portable computers
Computer-related introductions in 1989